Tsetsenbaataryn Darambayar (born 8 August 1992) is a Mongolian international footballer. He made his first appearance for the Mongolia national football team in 2013.

References

1992 births
Mongolian footballers
Mongolia international footballers
Khoromkhon players
Living people
Association football defenders
Mongolian National Premier League players
Tuv Buganuud FC players